St. George's Anglican Church is an Anglican parish church in the city of Moncton, New Brunswick, Canada.

In 1996, St. George's was designated a Heritage Property by the City of Moncton.

History 

The current St. George's church is the third to stand on the same property.  The land which now is at the corner of Church and Queen street was donated by Judge Bliss Botsford in 1852 for the purpose of building a new Anglican church.  Prior to the erection of the building, the congregation had worshiped at Moncton's Free Meeting House.

The first St. George's Church opened August 12, 1852.  In 1853, the church was consecrated by Bishop John Medley on June 5.  The church was destroyed by fire in 1873, and the congregation worshiped in another temporary location for two years.

References

Buildings and structures in Moncton
Anglican church buildings in New Brunswick
20th-century Anglican church buildings in Canada
Churches completed in 1935